Conventioneers is a 2005 American comedy film directed by Mora Stephens, depicting a romance between a delegate at the Republican National Convention and a member of the Democratic Party.

At Rotten Tomatoes, the film received 75% positive reviews from the T-meter critics, including The New York Times Nathan Lee.

References

External links
 
 Film Trailer at WNET's website.

2005 films
American political comedy films
2005 romantic comedy films
Films about elections
2000s English-language films
2000s American films
John Cassavetes Award winners